Kaufering is a municipality in the district of Landsberg in Bavaria in Germany. It lies on the river Lech.

During World War II, a subcamp of Dachau concentration camp was located there.

Notable people
 Andreas Mäckler (born 1958), German editor

References

External links
 The European Holocaust Memorial - Citizens´ Association "Landsberg in the 20th Century" (English) 
 Citizens´ Association "Landsberg in the 20th Century" - Founded 9 November 1983 - Since over 30 year active within the remembrance of the local Holocaust Concentration Camp Kaufering/Landsberg 
  European Holocaust Memorial - a monument ensemble against racism and totalitarianism at the place of the crime - under the executive management of European Holocaust Memorial Foundation

Landsberg (district)